"Stabat Mater speciosa" ("The beautiful mother stood") is a Catholic hymn to Mary about the Nativity of Jesus.

It has since been viewed as one of the tenderest Marian hymns and one of the seven greatest Latin hymns. It has become part of standard oratorios (e.g. Franz Liszt's Christus), and has given rise to various Christmas carols.

References

Marian hymns